Đurica Župarić (born 22 September 1984 in Croatia) is a Croatian retired footballer who is last known to have played for Segesta Sisak in his home country.

Career

NK Marsonia 1909

Due to NK Marsonia 1909 not paying for his apartment, Župarić was bereft of a home for some time, staying on the streets.

Singapore

Arriving at Hougang United of the Singaporean S.League in 2014, Župarić had a good impression of Singapore, saying that the league was professionally organized. However, the Croatian defender was unavailable for the Cheetahs clash hosting Albirex, limping off his previous game.

Personal life
He has a younger brother who lives with his father and works in the tourism industry.

References

External links
 

1984 births
Living people
People from Rovinj
Association football defenders
Croatian footballers
NK Imotski players
Barcsi SC footballers
HNK Segesta players
NK Žminj players
NK Marsonia players
NK HAŠK players
Hougang United FC players
Kanbawza F.C. players
First Football League (Croatia) players
Second Football League (Croatia) players
Singapore Premier League players
Myanmar National League players
Croatian expatriate footballers
Expatriate footballers in Hungary
Croatian expatriate sportspeople in Hungary
Expatriate footballers in Singapore
Croatian expatriate sportspeople in Singapore
Expatriate footballers in Myanmar